Muro-ami or muroami is a fishing technique employed on coral reefs in Southeast Asia. It uses an encircling net together with pounding devices. These devices usually comprise large stones fitted on ropes that are pounded into the coral reefs. They can also consist of large heavy blocks of cement that are suspended above the sea by a crane fitted to the vessel. The pounding devices are repeatedly and violently lowered into the area encircled by the net, literally smashing the coral in that area into small fragments in order to scare the fish out of their coral refuges. The "crushing" effect of the pounding process on the coral heads has been described as having long-lasting and practically totally destructive effects.

See also
Environmental issues with coral reefs

References

Fishing techniques and methods
Environmental impact of fishing